(born 28 November 1936) is a Japanese actor from the city of Fujinomiya, Shizuoka Prefecture, Japan.  In 1956, he signed with Toei film company. He appears in both contemporary roles and in the historical dramas known as jidaigeki.

Selected filmography
Satomi has appeared in over 130 films. Among these are
 Shinsengumi (1958)
 Kunisada Chūji (1958)
 Shinran (1960)
 Akō Rōshi (1961)
 13 Assassins (1963) – Shinrokurō Saimada
 School Wars: Hero (2004)
 April Fools (2015)

Selected television appearances
Satomi has portrayed many historical personages. Among them are Ōishi Kuranosuke, Saigō Takamori, Enomoto Takeaki, Musashibō Benkei, and Yamamoto Kansuke. In addition, he has had prominent roles in several series:

Mito Kōmon
As 2nd Suke-san (Sasaki Sukesaburō) (1971–1988)
As 5th Tokugawa Mitsukuni (2002–2011)
Ōedo Sōsamō (1974-1979)
Chōshichirō Edo Nikki (1983–1991) 
Byakkotai (1986) – Saigō Tanomo
Edo o Kiru (1987, 1994)
Homura Tatsu (1993) - Aterui, Abe no Yoritoki 
Shōgun no Onmitsu! Kage Jūhachi (1996) – Tokugawa Munetada
Toshiie and Matsu (2002) – Uesugi Kagekatsu
Ryōmaden (2010) – Chiba Sadakichi
Legal High (2012–13) – Hattori
Totto-chan! (2017) – Tatsuo Ōoka
Slow na Bushi ni Shitekure (2019) – himself
13 Assassins (2020) – Doi Toshitsura
What Will You Do, Ieyasu? (2023) – Tōyo-shōnin

Selected voice roles
Hercule Poirot in Agatha Christie's Great Detectives Poirot and Marple

References

External links

1936 births
Living people
Japanese male actors
People from Fujinomiya, Shizuoka
Actors from Shizuoka Prefecture